Charles Heath was an English engraver.

Charles Heath may also refer to:
 Charles Heath (Monmouth) (1761–1831), British printer, writer and radical
 Charles H. Heath (1829–1889), Vermont politician and attorney
 Charles Ernest Heath (1854–1936), senior British Army officer

See also
 Charles Heath House, Brookline, Massachusetts